Devey is a surname. Notable people with the surname include:

George Devey (1820–1886), English architect
Harry Devey (1864–1940), English footballer
Hilary Devey (1957–2022), English businesswoman and television personality
Jack Devey (1866–1940), English footballer and cricketer
Jordan Devey (born 1988), American football player
Phil Devey (born 1977), Canadian baseball player
Ray Devey (1917–2001), English footballer
Ted Devey (1871–1945), English footballer
Will Devey (1865–1935), English footballer

See also
Donald Tomaskovic-Devey (born 1957), American sociologist